Time Is Money is an aphorism that is claimed to have originated in "Advice to a Young Tradesman", an essay by Benjamin Franklin that appeared in George Fisher’s 1748 book, The American Instructor: or Young Man’s Best Companion, in which Franklin wrote, "Remember that time is money."

However, the phrase was already in print in 1719 in the Whig newspaper The Free-Thinker: "In vain did his Wife inculcate to him, That Time is Money ..."

The saying is intended to convey the monetary cost of laziness, by pointing out that when one is paid for the amount of time one spends working, minimizing non-working time also minimizes the amount of money that is lost to other pursuits.

References

English proverbs
Quotations from literature
Slogans
1740s neologisms